Herbert Widmayer (17 November 1913 – 31 July 1998) was a German football player and manager. He is the first ever coach to be prematurely terminated in Bundesliga history. He was the younger brother of Werner Widmayer

Widmayer played Holstein Kiel, 1860 Munich and Eintracht Braunschweig. After World War II he commenced a coaching career.

In 1960, he joined 1. FC Nürnberg, the most titled German club then, succeeding the Austrian player legend Franz Binder. He led Nürnberg, in Germany nicknamed "the Club", to the South German Championship in the same year. In the final of the tournament for the national title Nürnberg defeated Borussia Dortmund in front of 82,000 spectators in Hanover's Niedersachsenstadion with 3–0. In the following year the Club once more won the South German Championship, and once more reached the national final, this time in Berlin's Olympic Stadium, and losing there 4–0 vs 1. FC Köln.

Honours
German Championship 1961
German Cup 1962

References

External links
 

1913 births
1998 deaths
Sportspeople from Kiel
German footballers
Footballers from Schleswig-Holstein
Association football forwards
Holstein Kiel players
TSV 1860 Munich players
Eintracht Braunschweig players
German football managers
VfL Bochum managers
1. FC Nürnberg managers
Karlsruher SC managers
Bundesliga managers
KSV Hessen Kassel managers